The National Prosecution Service is the official prosecutorial agency of the Philippines. Although it is an official prosecutorial agency, it is not autonomous from the Department of Justice unlike its counterparts such as the Philippine National Police, National Bureau of Investigation, Philippine Drug Enforcement Agency, National Intelligence Coordinating Agency, Bureau of Customs, Bureau of Corrections, and the Bureau of Immigration.

History 
The National Prosecution Service has existed before its creation in the form of the Prosecution Staff of the Bureau of Justice and later, the Department of Justice during the American colonial era. The National Prosecution Service was created by virtue of Presidential Decree No. 1275, s. 1978. P.D. No. 1275 was later amended and repealed by Republic Act No. 10071, or the Prosecution Service Act of 2010, which strengthened the powers and organization of the National Prosecution Service.

Leadership 

 President of the Philippines – Pres. Bongbong Marcos
 Secretary of Justice – Sec. Jesus Crispin Remulla
 Prosecutor General of the National Prosecution Service – PG. Benedicto Malcontento

Organization 
The National Prosecution Service is divided into four levels:

 The Prosecution Staff, headed by the Prosecutor General, which is administratively under the Office of the Secretary of Justice;
 The Regional Prosecution Offices, headed by Regional Prosecutors;
 The Offices of the Provincial Prosecutors; and
 The Offices of the City Prosecutors.

Abbreviations 
 PG - Prosecutor General
 RP - Regional Prosecutor
 PP - Provincial Prosecutor
 CP - City Prosecutor

Rank structure 
The current rank system of the NPS as provided under Section 15 of Republic Act No. 10071:

Notes

References 

Prosecution
Department of Justice (Philippines)